Anna Leah is an English-born former New Zealand pop singer. Her single "Love Bug" was a top five hit.

Life and career
Born in Birmingham, England, Anna Leah released her first single in 1973. After signing to EMI, Anna had a big hit with "Love Bug" b/w "1-2-3-4-5" and it became popular with children and her next success was "Wahine" about the sinking of the ship of the same name near the shores of Wellington. Released in 1975, it peaked at #16. After relocating to Australia, Ms. Leah's singing career waned.

References

Living people
20th-century New Zealand women singers
Year of birth missing (living people)